Los Piojos were an  Argentine rock band. Extremely popular, it became one of the seminal bands of the 1990s Argentine music scene.

Unlike most suburban outfits, however, their style evolved significantly with each successive album, not only developing a unique style for the band but also incorporating elements of murga, candombe, and tango to an electric guitar base. This plus frontman Ciro's songwriting has made them one of the most popular bands in modern Argentine rock, with a strong following across Latin America and Europe, unusual for a band in their subgenre of Argentine rock.

History 
The band's origins can be traced to 1988 when a bunch of friends from different cities decided to try playing music. They began doing so in the pubs of the western suburbs of Buenos Aires, a similar beginning as many other suburban rock bands. In 1991, they headed to Europe to participate in an anti-racist music festival in France, where they played with groups from Mali, Burkina Faso, Cuba, and Spain. 

Los Piojos made their commercial debut in 1992 with Chactuchac which was received favorably by Patricio Rey y sus Redonditos de Ricota.

Ay Ay Ay followed in 1994, and both sold reasonably well and Ciro's songwriting was beginning to develop. However, the band's success was hampered by the domination by the Nuevo Rock Argentino rock ("New Argentine Rock") of the first half of the 1990s.

The band's third studio album, Tercer Arco, benefited from the suburban rock explosion of 1996: that year alone La Renga released their seminal album Despedazado por Mil Partes, Viejas Locas released their debut with the hit single "Intoxicado", among other events that sent suburban rock to the mainstream and ended new Argentine rock's dominance.

By the second half of the year Los Piojos were filling arenas and small stadiums. And by the start of 1997, Tercer Arco had gone double-platinum. The single "El Farolito" was at the top of rotation in most radio stations, and the video for "Maradó" (about former football player Diego Maradona) as well as that for "Verano del 92" made top 10 on MTV.

To many, 1998's follow up studio album Azul is the best from the group. The band's assimilation of all types of eastern Argentine musical rhythms became clear with this release, and their eclectic nature did not cut into their popularity, in fact it made them more accessible to a wider Latin American taste, and so Los Piojos went on tour in Mexico and the United States. Ritual saw the light in 1999 as the 5th album for the band.

The new millennium arrived and saw Los Piojos still active. They performed several concerts with sellout numbers alongside other suburban rock acts such as Divididos, La Renga, Viejas Locas, and ska-Latin band Los Auténticos Decadentes.

The group released Verde Paisaje del Infierno in 2000. In 2003 the band came out with their 7th full-length, Máquina de Sangre. It became one of the best selling Argentinian albums of the year. The band would also sell out 70,000 seat River Plate Stadium, something only achieved locally by bands such as Soda Stereo, and the most important foreign musical acts.

Band members
Current members
Andrés Ciro Martínez: vocals, harmonica, and rhythm guitar
Juanchi Bisio: lead guitar
Sebastián "Roger" Cardero: drums
Miguel Ángel "Micky" Rodríguez: bass, backing vocals
Live Only
Facundo "Changuíto" Farías Gómez: percussion
Miguel "Chucky" De Ipola: keyboards
Former members
Gustavo Kupinski: lead guitar †
Daniel "Piti" Fernández: guitar
Daniel Buira:  drums

Discography

Studio albums
 Chactuchac (1992)
 Ay Ay Ay (1994)
 Tercer arco (1996)
 Azul (1998)
 Verde paisaje del Infierno (2000)
 Máquina de sangre (2003)
 Civilización (2007)

Live albums
 Ritual (1999)
 Huracanes en Luna plateada (2002)

Videos
 Fantasmas peleándole al viento (2006)
 Desde lejos no se ve (2007)

References

Argentine rock music groups
Musical groups established in 1988